Derek Sanderson is a retired American soccer player who played professionally in eight leagues including the North American Soccer League, Major Indoor Soccer League and American Professional Soccer League.  He played three games for the U.S. at the 1983 FIFA World Youth Championship.

Professional
In 1982, Sanderson graduated from Mount Pleasant High School.  That year, the Portland Timbers selected Sanderson in the fourth round of the North American Soccer League draft.  However, Sanderson never cracked the first team.  In the fall of 1982, he moved to the Golden Bay Earthquakes as they competed in the Major Indoor Soccer League.  He remained with the Earthquakes for the 1983 North American Soccer League season, but spent much of the season with the United States men's national under-20 soccer team.  In 1984, Sanderson moved to the Jacksonville Tea Men of the United Soccer League.  That fall, he joined the Kalamazoo Kangaroos of the American Indoor Soccer Association.  In 1985, he rejoined the Earthquakes, now playing in the Western Alliance Challenge Series.  In the fall of 1985, Sanderson rejoined the Kangaroos, beginning the season in Kalamazoo before being traded to the Milwaukee Wave halfway through the season.  In the summer of 1986, he again played for the Earthquakes.  That fall, he rejoined the Wave for the 1986–1987 AISA season.  In February 1987, the Wave sold his contract to the Tampa Bay Rowdies.  He remained with the Rowdies as they played an independent outdoor season in 1987.  In 1988, he began the American Soccer League season with the Rowdies, but was released on April 30, 1988 to free up a roster spot for Mark Kane.  A week later, he signed with the Orlando Lions.  In 1989, Sanderson returned to Northern California to join the San Francisco Bay Blackhawks.  In 1990, he played for the Salt Lake Sting in the American Professional Soccer League which had been formed by the merger of the Western Soccer Alliance and the American Soccer League.  In 1991, Sanderson began the season with the Sting but moved to the Fort Lauderdale Strikers after the Sting experienced financial difficulties.  That season, he was a First Team All Star.  On April 9, 1992, Sanderson signed with the Colorado Foxes.  After failing to score in seven games, the Foxes sent him to the Miami Freedom.  In 1998, he came out of retirement to play one game for the California Jaguars.

International
In 1983, Sanderson played for the United States men's national under-20 soccer team at the 1983 FIFA World Youth Championship.

References

External links
 NASL/MISL stats
 FIFA: Derek Sanderson

Living people
1963 births
American soccer players
American Indoor Soccer Association players
American Professional Soccer League players
American Soccer League (1988–89) players
California Jaguars players
Colorado Foxes players
Fort Lauderdale Strikers (1988–1994) players
Golden Bay Earthquakes (MISL) players
Jacksonville Tea Men players
Kalamazoo Kangaroos players
Major Indoor Soccer League (1978–1992) players
Miami Freedom players
Milwaukee Wave players
National Professional Soccer League (1984–2001) players
North American Soccer League (1968–1984) players
Orlando Lions players
Portland Timbers (1975–1982) players
Salt Lake Sting players
San Francisco Bay Blackhawks players
San Jose Earthquakes (1974–1988) players
Tampa Bay Rowdies (1975–1993) players
United Soccer League (1984–85) players
Western Soccer Alliance players
United States men's under-20 international soccer players
Association football midfielders
Association football forwards